This article is about the demographic features of the population of Senegal, including population density, ethnicity, education level, health of the populace, economic status, religious affiliations and other aspects of the population.

About 42% of Senegal's population is rural. In rural areas, population density varies from about 77 per square kilometer (200/mile²) in the west-central region to 2 per square kilometer (5/mile²) in the arid eastern section. The average population density for the country is 68 people per square kilometer (169/sq mi). French is the official language but is used regularly only by the literate minority. Almost all Senegalese speak an indigenous language, of which Wolof has the largest usage. Many Senegalese live in Europe, particularly in France, Italy and Spain.

Population

According to the 2018 revision of the World Population Review the total population was 16,302,789 in May 2018, compared to only 2,416,000 in 1950. The proportion of children below the age of 15 in 2017 was 41.5%, between 15 and 54 years of age was 31.1%, while 55 years or older was 6.9%.
.

Population Estimates by Sex and Age Group (Estimates 1.VII.2020):

Vital statistics
Registration of vital events in Senegal is not complete. The Population Department of the United Nations prepared the following estimates.

Fertility and births
Total Fertility Rate (TFR) (Wanted Fertility Rate) and Crude Birth Rate (CBR):

Fertility data by region (DHS Program):

Life expectancy

Ethnic groups

Wolof 37.1%, Pular 26.2%, Serer 17%, Mandinka 5.6%, Jola 4.5%, Soninke 1.4%, Other 8.3% (includes 50,000 Europeans and persons of Lebanese descent) (2017)

About 50,000 Europeans -represents the 0.3% of the population of Senegal- (mostly French) and Lebanese and Vietnamese reside in Senegal, mainly in the cities.

Languages

French (official), Wolof, Pulaar, Serer, Jola, Mandinka, Soninke

Religion

The religious beliefs of the 2016 population of Senegal are: Muslim 96.1% (mostly Sunni), Christian 3.6% (mostly Roman Catholic), animist 0.3%.

Other general statistics 

The following demographic statistics of Senegal are from the World Population Review.
One birth every 55 seconds	
One death every 6 minutes	
One net migrant every 26 minutes	
Net gain of one person every 1 minutes

The following demographic are from the CIA World Factbook unless otherwise indicated.

Population
17,923,036 (2022 est.)
15,020,945 (July 2018 est.)

Religions
Muslim 97.2% (most adhere to one of the four main Sufi brotherhoods), Christian 2.7% (mostly Roman Catholic) (2019 est.)

Age structure

0-14 years: 40.38% (male 3,194,454/female 3,160,111)
15-24 years: 20.35% (male 1,596,896/female 1,606,084)
25-54 years: 31.95% (male 2,327,424/female 2,700,698)
55-64 years: 4.21% (male 283,480/female 378,932)
65 years and over: 3.1% (male 212,332/female 275,957) (2020 est.)

0-14 years: 41.15% (male 3,106,942 /female 3,074,740)
15-24 years: 20.33% (male 1,521,868 /female 1,531,484)
25-54 years: 31.45% (male 2,176,052 /female 2,547,566)
55-64 years: 4.05% (male 261,682 /female 347,374)
65 years and over: 3.02% (male 200,079 /female 253,158) (2018 est.)

Birth rate
31.51 births/1,000 population (2022 est.) Country comparison to the world: 27th
32.9 births/1,000 population (2018 est.) Country comparison to the world: 27th
33.4 births/1,000 population (2017 est.)

Death rate
5.08 deaths/1,000 population (2022 est.) Country comparison to the world: 193rd
7.9 deaths/1,000 population (2018 est.) Country comparison to the world: 94th
8.1 deaths/1,000 population (2017 est.)

Total fertility rate
4.27 children born/woman (2022 est.) Country comparison to the world: 23rd
4.2 children born/woman (2018 est.) Country comparison to the world: 30th

Population growth rate
2.57% (2022 est.) Country comparison to the world: 17th
2.36% (2018 est.) Country comparison to the world: 30th
2.39% (2017 est.)

Median age
total: 19.4 years. Country comparison to the world: 203rd
male: 18.5 years
female: 20.3 years (2020 est.)

total: 19 years. Country comparison to the world: 205th
male: 18.1 years
female: 19.9 years (2018 est.)

Total: 18.8 years
Male: 18 years
Female: 19.7 years (2017 est.)

Mother's mean age at first birth
21.9 years (2019 est.)
21.5 years (2016 est.)
note: median age at first birth among women 25-29

Contraceptive prevalence rate
26.9% (2019)
25.1% (2016)

Net migration rate
-0.71 migrant(s)/1,000 population (2022 est.) Country comparison to the world: 133rd
-1.4 migrant(s)/1,000 population (2018 est.) Country comparison to the world: 151st

Dependency ratios
Total: 85.4
Youth: 79.8
Elderly: 5.6
Potential support ratio: 18 (2015 est.)

Urbanization
urban population: 49.1% of total population (2022)
rate of urbanization: 3.59% annual rate of change (2020-25 est.)

urban population: 47.2% of total population (2018)
rate of urbanization: 3.73% annual rate of change (2015-20 est.)

Life expectancy at birth
total population: 69.96 years. Country comparison to the world: 171st
male: 68.23 years
female: 71.77 years (2022 est.)

total population: 62.5 years
male: 60.4 years
female: 64.7 years (2018 est.)

Total population: 62.1 years (2017 est.), 59.78 years (2011 est.), 59.25 years (2006 est.)
Male: 60 years (2017 est.), 57.85 years (2011 est.), 57.7 years (2006 est.)
Female: 64.3 years (2017 est.), 61.77 years (2011 est.), 60.85 years (2006 est.)

Urbanization
urban population: 47.2% of total population (2018)
rate of urbanization: 3.73% annual rate of change (2015-20 est.)

Major infectious diseases
degree of risk: very high (2020)
food or waterborne diseases: bacterial and protozoal diarrhea, hepatitis A, and typhoid fever
vectorborne diseases: malaria and dengue fever
water contact diseases: schistosomiasis
animal contact diseases: rabies
respiratory diseases: meningococcal meningitis

note: on 21 March 2022, the US Centers for Disease Control and Prevention (CDC) issued a Travel Alert for polio in Africa; Senegal is currently considered a high risk to travelers for circulating vaccine-derived polioviruses (cVDPV); vaccine-derived poliovirus (VDPV) is a strain of the weakened poliovirus that was initially included in oral polio vaccine (OPV) and that has changed over time and behaves more like the wild or naturally occurring virus; this means it can be spread more easily to people who are unvaccinated against polio and who come in contact with the stool or respiratory secretions, such as from a sneeze, of an “infected” person who received oral polio vaccine; the CDC recommends that before any international travel, anyone unvaccinated, incompletely vaccinated, or with an unknown polio vaccination status should complete the routine polio vaccine series; before travel to any high-risk destination, CDC recommends that adults who previously completed the full, routine polio vaccine series receive a single, lifetime booster dose of polio vaccine

Maternal mortality ratio
315 deaths/100,000 live births (2015 est.)

Drinking water source
improved
total: 78.5% of population
urban: 92.9% of population
rural: 67.3% of population

unimproved
total: 21.5% of population
urban: 7.1% of population
rural: 32.7% of population (2015 est.)

Education expenditures
5.3% of GDP (2019) Country comparison to the world: 51st

Literacy
definition: age 15 and over can read and write (2017 est.)
total population: 51.9%
male: 64.8%
female: 39.8% (2017 est.)

Total population: 57.7%
Male: 69.7%
Female: 46.6% (2015 est.)

School life expectancy (primary to tertiary education)
total: 9 years
male: 8 years
female: 9 years (2020)

total: 9 years
male: 9 years
female: 9 years (2017)

Unemployment, youth ages 15-24
total: 4.1%
male: 2.9%
female: 6.7% (2019 est.)

Gender ratio
At birth: 1.03 male(s)/female
Under 15 years: 1.01 male(s)/female
15-64 years: 0.98 male(s)/female
65 years and over: 0.87 male(s)/females
Total population: 0.99 male(s)/female (2011 est.)

Emigration
Senegal was historically a destination country for neighboring economic migrants, but in recent decades West African migrants more often use Senegal as a transit point to North Africa, or as a stop before continuing illegally onward to Europe. The country also has been host to several thousand black Mauritanian refugees since they were expelled from Mauritania during the 1989 border conflict with Senegal. The country's economic crisis in the 1970s stimulated emigration; departures accelerated from the 1990s. Destinations shifted from neighboring countries to Libya and Mauritania, because of their booming oil industries, and to France, Italy and Spain.

See also
Senegal

References

External links 
 

 
Society of Senegal

pt:Senegal#Demografia